The Russel Range is a subrange of the Finlay Ranges of the Omineca Mountains, located between Finlay River and Pelly Creek in northern British Columbia, Canada.

Geologist R.G. McConnell named Russel Range after his assistant, H. Y. Russel.

References

Omineca Mountains